Jeanette Marie Boxill (née Bozanic) is an American academic who was Senior Lecturer in Philosophy (ethics) at the University of North Carolina at Chapel Hill. She was also Chair of the Faculty and Director of Parr Center for Ethics. Her writing and teaching relate broadly with ethical issues in social conduct, social and political philosophy, feminist theory, and ethics in sports. She is editor of Sports Ethics: An Anthology and Issues in Race and Gender. She is past president of the International Association for Philosophy in Sport, serves on the board of the NCAA Scholarly Colloquium Committee, and chairs both the 2011 NCAA Scholarly Colloquium and the Education Outreach Program for the U.S. Anti-Doping Agency (USADA). For 25 years, Boxill was the public address announcer for UNC women's basketball and field hockey. She is a member of numerous professional associations (philosophy, sports, and the American Association of University Women) and has won a number of awards (from inside her institution and beyond) for teaching and professional contributions. She resigned from UNC in 2015 in the wake of the UNC Chapel Hill academics-athletics scandal.

Early life and education 
Jan Boxill was born Jeanette Marie Bozanic circa 1939 in Worcester, New York. Her father John was an immigrant from Yugoslavia, and her mother Martha was an immigrant from Czechoslovakia.

After graduating from Worcester Central School in 1956, Bozanic joined the United States Air Force and played saxophone in the Women's Air Force Band. She then enrolled at the University of California, Los Angeles using the G.I. Bill and played club basketball while completing her Bachelor of Arts degree in political science. After completing her B.A. in 1967, she earned an M.A. in philosophy in 1975 followed by a Ph.D. in philosophy in 1981, both also at UCLA.

Teaching career

 Instructor, California State University, Los Angeles, 1973–1979
Assistant Professor, University of Tampa, 1981–1985
Visiting Assistant Professor, University of North Carolina at Chapel Hill, 1985–1987
 Assistant Professor, Elon College, Elon, NC, 1987–1988
 Lecturer in Philosophy, University of North Carolina at Chapel Hill, 1988–2004
 Senior Lecturer in Philosophy, University of North Carolina at Chapel Hill, 2004–2014At UNC,

Academic work 
Her writing and teaching relate broadly with ethical issues in social conduct, social and political philosophy, feminist theory, and ethics in sports. She is editor of Sports Ethics: An Anthology and Issues in Race and Gender. She is past president of the International Association for Philosophy in Sport, serves on the board of the NCAA Scholarly Colloquium Committee, and chairs both the 2011 NCAA Scholarly Colloquium and the Education Outreach Program for the U.S. Anti-Doping Agency (USADA). For 25 years, Boxill was the public address announcer for UNC women's basketball and field hockey.

At UNC, she was Senior Lecturer in Philosophy (ethics) and also Chair of the Faculty and Director of Parr Center for Ethics.

She is a member of numerous professional associations (philosophy, sports, and the American Association of University Women) and has won a number of awards (from inside her institution and beyond) for teaching and professional contributions.  She resigned from UNC in 2015 in the wake of the UNC Chapel Hill academics-athletics scandal.

UNC academics-athletics scandal

From 1991 to 2011, Boxill was an academic advisor for the North Carolina Tar Heels women's basketball team at UNC Chapel Hill.

Boxill resigned from her employment at UNC in February 2015, after it was alleged that she had steered athletes toward 'scam courses' in order to qualify for the school's sports teams. Boxill, who had been the faculty chair, a senior lecturer in ethics, and an academic counselor for athletes had been told on October 22, 2014, that her employment with the university would be terminated, but she had been appealing that institutional decision. Then, she announced her resignation on February 28, 2015. Systematic investigation of the 20-year-long 'incident' was published in The Wainstein Report The NCAA initially accused her of giving impermissible academic assistance and special arrangements to women’s basketball players. Three months later, after reviewing the record and hearing her explanations at a hearing, the NCAA cleared her.

Personal life
While at UCLA, she married Bernard R. Boxill, who also teaches philosophy as the Pardue Distinguished Professor of Philosophy at UNC and focuses upon social and political philosophy and African American philosophy.

Publications

Books
 Boxill, J. (Ed.). Sports Ethics: An Anthology. December 2002, Wiley-Blackwell. , 376 pages
 Boxill, J. Issues in Race and Gender, edited anthology, Kendall-Hunt Publishers, 2000.

Articles 
 Boxill, J. "Ethics and Making Ethical Decisions," Chapter for Introduction to Sports Management, edited by Richard Southall, Kendall-Hunt Publishers, Spring 2010.
 Boxill, J. "Football and Feminism," Journal of the Philosophy of Sport, Spring 2006.
 Boxill, J. "The Moral Significance of Sport," Introduction, Sports Ethics. 2003, pp. 1–14
 Boxill, J. "The Ethics of Competition," Sports Ethics, pp. 107–114.
 Boxill, J. "Title IX and Gender Equity," reprinted in Sports Ethics, pp. 254–261. Reprinted in, Issues in Gender and Race.
 Boxill, J. "Affirmative Action Revisited," co-authored with Bernard Boxill, in A Companion to Applied Ethics, edited by R. G. Frey and Christopher Heath Wellman, Blackwell Publishers, Fall, 2002, pp. 118–127. Reprinted in 2005 and 2008. , 
 Boxill, J. "Affirmative Action as Reverse Discrimination," Issues in Race and Gender, 2000, pp. 127–131
 Boxill, J. "Title IX and Gender Equity," Issues in Race and Gender, 2000, pp. 166–173.
 Boxill, J. "Sport as a Forum for Public Ethics," Sports and Society, Telecourse integrating Sports and the Humanities, January 1999.
 Boxill, J. "The Dunk and Women's Basketball," Women's Basketball Coaches Journal, March 1995.
 Boxill, J. "Gender Equity and Title IX," Journal of the Philosophy of Sport, Vol. XX-XXI,1995.
 Boxill, J. "Beauty, Gender and Sport," Journal of Philosophy of Sport, 1985. Reprinted in Philosophic Inquiry in Sport, edited by William J. Moran and Klaus V. Meier, Human Kinetics Publishers, 1987. ; .

Work in progress
 Boxill, J. Front Porch Ethics, manuscript on ethics in sports.
 Boxill, J. "True Sport Report," US Anti-Doping Agency Education Outreach Program.
 Boxill, J. "Review of: The Game of Life, by James Shulman and William Bowen, and Reclaiming the Game, by William Bower and Sarah Levin," Ethics

Honors and awards
 
 Award of Excellence, presented by the Governor's Council on Physical Fitness and Health for outstanding achievement and commitment to women's sports in North Carolina, 1994.
 UNC Learning Disabilities Services Access Award for supporting and encouraging the potential of LD students at UNC-CH, 1995 Frank Porter Graham Graduate and Professional Student Honor Society, Inductee, 2009.
 Tanner Faculty Award for Excellence in Undergraduate Teaching, University of North Carolina, Spring 1998
 Parr Ethics Fellow, Ethics Fellowship at the Institute for the Arts and Humanities, Fall 2Women's Advocacy Award, presented by the Carolina Women's Center, 2005.
 President, International Association of the Philosophy of Sport, Elected office, 2002–2005.
 Excellence in Advising Award, University of North Carolina, 2003.
 Mary Turner Lane Award, presented by the Association of Women Faculty and Professionals, 2007

Professional associations
 American Philosophical Association
 Association for Practical and Professional Ethics
 Caribbean Philosophical Association
 Phi Sigma Tau, International Honor Society for Philosophy
 International Association of the Philosophy of Sport
 Program for the Study of Sport in the American South
 Women's Basketball Coaches Association
 American Association of University Women

See also
 Kenneth L. Wainstein
 Sara Ganim
 Wainstein Report

References

External links
 Jeannette Marie 'Jan' Boxill's Faculty page at the University of North Carolina
 CV, Jeanette Marie 'Jan' Boxill
 

1939 births
Living people
North Carolina Tar Heels
Philosophy academics
University of North Carolina at Chapel Hill faculty
American whistleblowers
American women academics
Women academic administrators
Feminist theorists
African-American philosophers
20th-century American philosophers
University of California, Los Angeles alumni
American people of Yugoslav descent
People from Otsego County, New York
American people of Czechoslovak descent
University of Kentucky faculty
University of Tampa faculty
University of South Florida faculty
University of California, Los Angeles faculty
Elon University faculty
California State University, Los Angeles faculty
American academic administrators
Philosophers of sport
21st-century American philosophers